A Newtonian fluid is a fluid in which the viscous stresses arising from its flow are at every point linearly correlated to the local strain rate — the rate of change of its deformation over time. Stresses are proportional to the rate of change of the fluid's velocity vector.

A fluid is Newtonian only if the tensors that describe the viscous stress and the strain rate are related by a constant viscosity tensor that does not depend on the stress state and velocity of the flow. If the fluid is also isotropic (mechanical properties are the same along any direction), the viscosity tensor reduces to two real coefficients, describing the fluid's resistance to continuous shear deformation and continuous compression or expansion, respectively.

Newtonian fluids are the simplest mathematical models of fluids that account for viscosity. While no real fluid fits the definition perfectly, many common liquids and gases, such as water and air, can be assumed to be Newtonian for practical calculations under ordinary conditions. However, non-Newtonian fluids are relatively common and include oobleck (which becomes stiffer when vigorously sheared) and non-drip paint (which becomes thinner when sheared). Other examples include many polymer solutions (which exhibit the Weissenberg effect), molten polymers, many solid suspensions, blood, and most highly viscous fluids.

Newtonian fluids are named after Isaac Newton, who first used the differential equation to postulate the relation between the shear strain rate and shear stress for such fluids.

Definition
An element of a flowing liquid or gas will suffer forces from the surrounding fluid, including viscous stress forces that cause it to gradually deform over time.

The deformation of a fluid element, relative to some previous state, can be first order approximated by a strain tensor that changes with time. The time derivative of that tensor is the strain rate tensor, that expresses how the element's deformation is changing with time; and is also the gradient of the velocity vector field  at that point, often denoted .

The tensors  and  can be expressed by 3×3 matrices, relative to any chosen coordinate system. The fluid is said to be Newtonian if these matrices are related by the equation

where  is a fixed 3×3×3×3 fourth order tensor that does not depend on the velocity or stress state of the fluid.

Incompressible isotropic case
For an incompressible and isotropic Newtonian fluid the viscous stress is related to the strain rate by the simple equation

where
 is the shear stress ("drag") in the fluid,
 is a scalar constant of proportionality, the shear viscosity of the fluid
 is the derivative of the velocity component that is parallel to the direction of shear, relative to displacement in the perpendicular direction.

If the fluid is incompressible and viscosity is constant across the fluid, this equation can be written in terms of an arbitrary coordinate system as

where
 is the th spatial coordinate
 is the fluid's velocity in the direction of axis 
 is the -th component of the stress acting on the faces of the fluid element perpendicular to axis .

One also defines a total stress tensor , that combines the shear stress with conventional (thermodynamic) pressure . The stress-shear equation then becomes

or written in more compact tensor notation

where  is the identity tensor.

For anisotropic fluids
More generally, in a non-isotropic Newtonian fluid, the coefficient  that relates internal friction stresses to the spatial derivatives of the velocity field is replaced by a nine-element viscous stress tensor .

There is general formula for friction force in a liquid: The vector differential of friction force is equal the viscosity tensor increased on vector product differential of the area vector of adjoining a liquid layers and rotor of velocity:

where  is the viscosity tensor. The diagonal components of viscosity tensor is molecular viscosity of a liquid, and not diagonal components – turbulence eddy viscosity.

Newtonian law of viscosity 
The following equation illustrates the relation between shear rate and shear stress:

where:
  is the shear stress,
  is the viscosity, and
  is the shear rate.
If viscosity is constant, the fluid is Newtonian.

Power law model 

The power law model is used to display the behavior of Newtonian and non-Newtonian fluids and measures shear stress as a function of strain rate.

The relationship between shear stress, strain rate and the velocity gradient for the power law model are:

where
 is the absolute value of the strain rate to the (n−1) power;
  is the velocity gradient;
 n is the power law index.

If
 n < 1 then the fluid is a pseudoplastic.
 n = 1 then the fluid is a Newtonian fluid.
 n > 1 then the fluid is a dilatant.

Fluid model 
The relationship between the shear stress and shear rate in a casson fluid model is defined as follows:

where τ0 is the yield stress and

where α depends on protein composition and H is the Hematocrit number.

Examples

Water, air, alcohol, glycerol, and thin motor oil are all examples of Newtonian fluids over the range of shear stresses and shear rates encountered in everyday life. Single-phase fluids made up of small molecules are generally (although not exclusively) Newtonian.

See also
 Fluid mechanics
 Non-Newtonian fluid

References

Viscosity
Fluid dynamics